The 2015 season was the Baltimore Ravens' 20th in the National Football League (NFL) and their eighth under head coach John Harbaugh. Although picked by some, including Sports Illustrated Peter King, to reach the Super Bowl, they had a disappointing season due to devastating injuries to team starters. 14 of their games were decided by 8 points or less and Joe Flacco, Justin Forsett, Steve Smith, Sr., and Terrell Suggs all suffered season ending injuries. They were eliminated from playoff contention in Week 14 with a loss to the Seattle Seahawks, in which they also suffered their ninth loss, resulting their first losing season in the Harbaugh era and first since the collapse of the Brian Billick era.  Ultimately the Ravens finished with a 5–11 record and twenty-two players ended the season on Injured Reserve. The 5–11 record is their worst since the 2007 season.

On a side note, as of 2022, their 20-19 loss to the Atlanta Falcons on September 3 remains the last time the Ravens have lost a preseason game, having won an NFL-record 23 consecutive preseason games ever since.

2015 draft class

Notes
 The Ravens traded their original fifth-round selection (No. 162 overall) to the Tampa Bay Buccaneers in exchange for guard/center Jeremy Zuttah.
 The Ravens traded defensive tackle Haloti Ngata and their seventh-round selection (No. 231 overall – previously acquired in a  trade that sent offensive tackle Bryant McKinnie to the Miami Dolphins) to the Detroit Lions in exchange for the Lions' fourth- and fifth-round selections (Nos. 122 and 158 overall, respectively).
 The Ravens traded their original sixth-round selection (No. 202 overall) to the Cleveland Browns in exchange for the Browns' 2014 seventh-round selection.
 The Ravens acquired an additional sixth-round selection (No. 204 overall) in a trade that sent their original seventh-round selection (No. 243 overall) and linebacker Rolando McClain to the Dallas Cowboys.
 The Ravens traded their second and fifth-round selection to acquire the No. 55 overall selection from the Arizona Cardinals.

Staff

Final roster

Preseason

Schedule

Regular season

Schedule

Note: Intra-division opponents are in bold text.

Game summaries

Week 1: Denver Broncos 19, Baltimore Ravens 13

The Ravens opened the season in Denver. Joe Flacco and the offense struggled through the entire game. Not only did the Ravens lose 19–13 and start the season 0–1, but they also lost Terrell Suggs to a torn achilles. It was later announced that Suggs would miss the entire 2015 season, jeopardizing the Ravens defense for the rest of the season.

Week 2: Oakland Raiders 37, Baltimore Ravens 33

With the tough loss, the Ravens dropped to 0–2, the first such start to a season since 2005.  The team also dropped to 7–2 all-time against the Raiders.  With wins by both the Steelers and the Browns, the Ravens remain in the AFC North basement.

Week 3: Cincinnati Bengals 28, Baltimore Ravens 24

With their fourth straight loss to the Bengals, the Ravens dropped to 0–3 and started the season with such a record for the first time in franchise history.

Week 4: Baltimore Ravens 23, Pittsburgh Steelers 20 (OT)

The Ravens finally produced a win against their archrival the Steelers to improve to 1–3.  With the Browns' loss to the Chargers on Sunday, both teams remain in last place in the division.

Week 5: Cleveland Browns 33, Baltimore Ravens 30 (OT)

The Ravens couldn't use the momentum from the Pittsburgh win to beat their division rival the Browns, losing in overtime 33–30, dropping to 1–4 for the first time in franchise history.  They fell back to solo last place in the division and also lost their first game to the Browns at home since 2007.  Harbaugh and Flacco's records dropped to 13–2 against the Browns as well.

Week 6: San Francisco 49ers 25, Baltimore Ravens 20

In a rematch of Super Bowl XLVII, the Ravens' defense was unable to keep up with San Francisco quarterback Colin Kaepernick and their former teammates Anquan Boldin and Torrey Smith.

Week 7: Arizona Cardinals 26, Baltimore Ravens 18

The Ravens, hoping to stop a five-game losing streak, travel to Arizona to take on the Cardinals. The defense struggled to contain the Cardinals explosive receiving corps. Late in the fourth quarter, Joe Flacco attempted to mount a comeback, but an interception in the end zone by the Cardinals sealed the loss. With the loss, the Ravens go to 1–6, tied for the worst record in the league with the Detroit Lions.

Week 8: Baltimore Ravens 29, San Diego Chargers 26

The Ravens were finally able to win a back and forth game, despite a poor showing from the defense, on a game-winning field goal from Justin Tucker. They improved to 2–6, but are still in last place in the AFC North because of their week 5 loss to the Browns.

Already missing Terrell Suggs for the season, the Ravens suffered another setback and this time Steve Smith, Sr. left the game with a ruptured Achilles tendon. The Ravens later announced that the injury will keep him out for the rest of the season.

Week 9: Bye Week
No game. Baltimore had a bye week.

Week 10: Jacksonville Jaguars 22, Baltimore Ravens 20

The Ravens were on the cusp of victory despite giving up the ball on three consecutive drives by two Joe Flacco interceptions and a Flacco lost fumble. However, on the last play of the game Elvis Dumervil sacked Jaguars QB Blake Bortles by grabbing onto his face mask, putting them into field goal range with one more play, which kicker Jason Myers converted to win the game, sending the Ravens to 2–7. It was later revealed that in fact, the Jaguars had not set before the aforementioned play, in which case they would have been penalized for a false start, and the ensuing ten-second runoff would have ended the game with the Ravens winning 20–19.

Week 11: Baltimore Ravens 16, St. Louis Rams 13

In another close game, the Ravens finally pulled together a win, despite another 2 missed field goals by Justin Tucker, on a game winning try from 41 yards. All three Ravens wins have now come from game ending scores by Tucker. Late in the first quarter, running back Justin Forsett broke his right arm, ending his season. On the final drive of the game, Flacco suffered a season ending knee injury.

Week 12: Baltimore Ravens 33, Cleveland Browns 27

In another wild game, the Ravens' second string offense, forced into starting roles due to mounting injuries, managed a win against the Browns, avoiding a season sweep which hasn't happened since 2007. The game was won on the last play of regulation, when defensive end Brent Urban blocked a Travis Coons 51-yard field goal attempt, which safety Will Hill returned 64 yards for a touchdown.

Week 13: Miami Dolphins 15, Baltimore Ravens 13

In another disappointing loss, the Ravens’ offense failed to capitalize on a fantastic defensive performance, with Schaub throwing another pick six along with another interception which also led to Miami's other touchdown. Another Justin Tucker missed field goal from 54 yards was the Ravens’ last chance at a comeback.

Week 14: Seattle Seahawks 35, Baltimore Ravens 6

Entering a game in which they were forced to start third-string quarterback Jimmy Clausen, the Ravens were outmaneuvered at every turn against a superior Seahawks team. With the loss, and the wins from the Steelers and the Jets, the Ravens were officially eliminated from postseason contention.  The team dropped to 4-9 and faced their first losing season since 2007.

This was the Ravens' first game of the season which was decided by more than one possession as the team's first 12 games were all decided by eight points or less.

Week 15: Kansas City Chiefs 34, Baltimore Ravens 14

The Ravens unexpectedly wore gold pants for this game. This drew criticism from their fan base.

Week 16: Baltimore Ravens 20, Pittsburgh Steelers 17

With the win, the Ravens improved to 5–10, and they swept the Steelers for the first time since their 2011 season.

Week 17: Cincinnati Bengals 24, Baltimore Ravens 16

The Ravens suffered their fifth straight loss to the Bengals, this time led by second year quarterback A. J. McCarron, who threw two touchdowns while Ravens starter Ryan Mallett was intercepted twice.   The loss dropped the Ravens to 5–11, their worst record since their 2007 season.
This was the final game for cornerback Tray Walker, as he died on March 18, 2016.

Standings

Division

Conference

References

External links
 

Baltimore
Baltimore Ravens seasons
Baltimore Ravens
2010s in Baltimore